Shabaab al Jabal is a Libyan football club based in Shahhat in the Jabal al Akhdar region of eastern Libya. The club plays in the Libyan Premier League.

Shabaab al Jabal had a decent cup run in the 2008–09 season, culminating in a third-round draw at the 11 June Stadium, where they faced Ittihad Tripoli. However, they were defeated 5–0.

Football clubs in Libya